Reedy River Industrial District runs along Reedy River between River Street and Camperdown Way, in Greenville, South Carolina. It was listed on the National Register of Historic Places in 1979.

See also
Reedy River Falls Historic Park and Greenway

References

Historic districts on the National Register of Historic Places in South Carolina
Industrial buildings and structures on the National Register of Historic Places in South Carolina
Historic districts in Greenville County, South Carolina
National Register of Historic Places in Greenville, South Carolina